Tunsbergdalsbreen is a glacier in the municipality of Luster in Vestland, Norway. It is a side branch of the Jostedalsbreen glacier, and is included in the Jostedalsbreen National Park.

See also
List of glaciers in Norway

References

Glaciers of Vestland
Luster, Norway